Iftikhar Ahamd Hussain Gilani (1936–2000) was a Pakistani Sufi mystic of silsala Aliya Qadria & Sajjada Nasheen Dargah-e-Hazrat Mehboob-e-Zat Mundair Syeddan Sharif Sialkot.

The shrine of the Gilani, as well as his father Ahmad Hussain Gilani Qadri, (1898–1961) are situated at Mundair Kalan.

Pakistani Sufis
1936 births
2000 deaths